Gerald Robinson may refer to:

Gerald Robinson (American football) (born 1963), American football player
Gerald Robinson (basketball, born 1984), American professional basketball player, played college basketball at Tennessee–Aiken
Gerald Robinson (basketball, born 1989), American professional basketball player, played college basketball at Georgia
Gerald Robinson  (born 1938), retired Roman Catholic priest who was convicted of the murder of Margaret Ann Pahl

See also
Gerard Robinson, school choice advocate in the United States